The Ministry of the Royal Court was an organization in Iran that acted as an intermediary between the Shah of Iran and government branches, including the cabinet and the parliament. It was extensively powerful during Pahlavi dynasty, and had an executive arm named the 'Special Bureau'. 

The minister of court never sat the in cabinet meetings, however his position ranked on par with Prime Minister of Iran.

List of ministers

Qajar dynasty
 Mohammad Rahim Khan Ala (1903–1920)
 Amin-os-soltan Ibrahim Khan (1920–1921)
 Amin-os-soltan Ali Ashgar Khan (1921–1925)

Pahlavi dynasty
 Abdol Hossein Teymourtash (1925–1932)
Dissolution of the Ministry of the Imperial Court (1932–1939)
 Mahmoud Jam (1939–1941)
 Mohammad Ali Farzin (1941–1942)
 Mohammad Ali Foroughi (1942)
 Hossein Ala' (1942–1945)
 Ebrahim Hakimi (? – 1947)
 Mahmoud Djam (1947 – ?) (2nd time)
 Abdolhossein Hazhir (July 1949 – February 1949)
 Ebrahim Hakimi (1949–1950) (2nd time)
 Hossein Ala' (1950–1950) (2nd time)
 Hossein Ala' (1951–1953) (3rd time)
 Abol Ghasem Amini (April 1953 – August 1953)
 Hossein Ala' (1953–1955) (4th time)
 Manouchehr Eghbal (1956–1957)
 Hossein Ala' (1957–1963) (5th time)
 Hossein Ghods-Nakhai (1963–1967)
 Asadollah Alam (1967–1977)
 Amir-Abbas Hoveyda (1977–1978)
 Aligholi Ardalan (1978–1979)

References 

1903 disestablishments in Iran
1979 disestablishments in Iran
Royal households
Monarchy in Persia and Iran
Ministries established in 1903
Ministries disestablished in 1979
Former government ministries of Iran